Car Torque is a South African television show produced by Hooper Productions, which deals with automotive journalism, including car reviews and analysis. It premiered on 11 April 2004 on SABC 3.

The program format is generally straightforward and simple, preferring to review cars in a conversational, sedate way. It is co-hosted by columnist David Bullard.

See also 
 List of South African television series

References

External links 
 Car Torque official website

SABC 3 original programming
Automotive television series
2004 South African television series debuts
2000s South African television series